Massimo Andrea Ugolini (born 26 July 1978) is a politician who served as a Captain Regent of San Marino (alongside Gian Nicola Berti). He was in office from 1 April 2016 to 1 October 2016 and is a member of the Sammarinese Christian Democratic Party.

References

1978 births
Captains Regent of San Marino
Members of the Grand and General Council
Sammarinese Christian Democratic Party politicians
Living people